Green leaf volatiles (GLV) are volatile organic compounds that are released when plants suffer tissue damage. Specifically, they include aldehydes, esters, and alcohols of 6-carbon compounds released after wounding. These compounds are very quickly produced and emitted, and are used by nearly every green plant. Plants constantly release GLVs, but un-stressed plants release them in much smaller amounts. Some of these chemicals act as signaling compounds between either plants of the same species, of other species, or even vastly different lifeforms like insects. Some, although not necessarily all, of these chemicals act essentially as plant pheromones.[12] GLVs also have antimicrobial properties to prevent infection at the site of injury.

Functions 
GLVs are used in both plant-plant and plant-insect interactions. They usually serve as a call for help or as a warning signal of oncoming causes of tissue damage.

Plant–plant interactions 
When a plant is attacked, it emits GLVs into the environment through the air. Undamaged neighboring plants perceive these GLV signals and activate the expression of genes related to the plants defense mechanisms This allows the plant emitting the GLVs and the neighboring plants to enter a primed state. In this primed state plants activate their defenses systems more quickly and in a stronger concentration. The amount of GLVs that a wounded plant emits is directly related to the severity of the injury, so the concentration of GLVs in the atmosphere and the frequency of exposure both play a role in neighboring plants successfully entering a primed state.

Positive plant–insect interactions 
In positive plant-insect interactions, GLVs are used as a form of defense. They alert predators to the locations of herbivores that are preying on the plant and causing tissue damage. For example, a study done by Northwestern University found that parasitic wasps are more attracted to plants that are emitting GLVs due to wounding from herbivores than to plants that are emitting GLVs due to mechanical damage. Another study done on parasitic wasps found that the release of GLV’s from orchids elicited the same effect as was seen in the Northwestern study, where parasitic wasps were attracted to the plants as a result of this pheromone release. What’s particular interesting about this case is the “deceit” that these orchids are undertaking by using these tactics. They don’t need to release this compound, but do so in order to trick these wasps to land on the plant and aid in pollination. This adaptive ability stems from altering the gene expression in order to produce the GLV’s that attracts these wasps. The corresponding GLV fits like a lock and key on the receptor of these wasps, so that a chemical signal can be initiated to cause this attraction. Even more beneficial to the orchids is the fact that these volatile compounds travel quicker in the air than through vascular tissue. 

Along with these points on parasitic wasps aiding plants, benefits of GLV release has also been seen in soybeans grown in Iowa. When these soybean plants became heavily infested by aphids, the amount of GLV released far surpassed normal levels and as a result, more spotted lady beetles were attracted to the pheromone releasing plants and preyed on the bugs eating the plant. The stimulus of aphid predation is chemically transmitted through the plant to coordinate an increase release of GLV’s. It’s also important to note that this particular chemical being released is unique to these spotted lady beetles and when different species of beetles were tested, there wasn’t any extra inclination for them to move towards GLV releasing plants. This indicates these soybeans’ evolved ability to release species specific pheromones to aid in their survival. This shows plant intelligence in the sense that resources aren’t wasted on producing mass GLV’s and the plant is aware of what pheromone is needed to produce this response. 

In order to determine if plants are capable of recognizing and distinguishing between GLVs, a study was done at University of California Davis where researchers exposed plants to GLVs emitted by a mechanically damaged tomato plant, and to GLVs emitted by a tomato plant that had been damaged by herbivores. Researchers observed a difference in the plants reaction, showing an increase in the proteins related to defense mechanisms for the plant exposed to the herbivore GLVs. This supports the theory that plants are able to distinguish between different GLVs, and react differently depending on which signal they receive.

Negative plant–insect interactions 
One of the causes of GLV release is to indicate fruit ripeness. Although this may be of effect in attracting pollinators, it also can cause issues if these GLV’s attracts predators. One such example of this is with boll weevils, as an increase of GLV release when the plants are ripe have been found to increase the predation rate of these beetles. This raises some concerns, as this increased predation rate on the host plant means that it must find new means of pheromone signaling and release to survive in the long run with this predator present.

Another issue with GLV release and increasing predation, is with populations that alter GLV emissions from the effected plants. In one case, it was noted that secretions from certain species of caterpillars significantly decrease the effect amount of GLV emissions. In order to determine what was being done to decrease GLV emissions, a study was run on four unique species of caterpillars to measure their effectiveness in decreasing GLV levels released from the predated plant. It’s been found that compounds in the gut and salivary glands, as well as modifications to those compounds in these vary species has been successfully able to mute a large part of the effect of GLV released into the external environment. How this is done is though stopping the flow of pheromone molecules, so they can’t interact with receptors on the leaves of other plants. Both the threat of boll weevils and caterpillars on plants that release GLV emissions indicate that not everything is positive as a result of its release and further research needs to be done in order to evaluate what else these plants do to compensate for these negative effects.

Antimicrobial properties 
Other benefits of green leaf volatiles are that at the site of damage, GLVs are released in high concentrations and act as antimicrobial agents to make the plant more resistant to bacterial or fungal infections. To study the anti-fungal properties of GLVs, researchers at the University of Arizona influenced how plants expressed HPL, the main enzyme of GLV synthesis. Scientists compared the rates of fungal spore growth in HPL over-expressing and HPL silencing mutants to the wild type plants. Results from the study showed lower rates of fungal growth and higher GLV emissions on the HPL over-expressing mutants, while the HPL silencing mutants showed higher rates of fungal growth and lower GLV emissions, which supports the hypothesis that GLVs have antimicrobial properties.

The antimicrobial properties of GLVs have also been part of an evolutionary arms race that raise questions for scientists. During an infection, plants emit GLVs to act as microbial agents, but bacteria and viruses have adapted to use these GLVs to their own benefit. The most common example of this is found in the red raspberry. When the red raspberry plant is infected, the virus influences it to produce more GLVs, which attract the red raspberry aphid. These GLVs cause more aphids to come and to feed on the plant for longer, giving the virus better chances of being ingested and spread more widely. Researchers are now trying to determine whether under infectious conditions plants emit GLVs for their benefit, or if bacteria and viruses induce the release of these compounds for their own benefit. Studies in this area have been inconclusive and contradictory.

See also 
 Kairomone
 Plant defenses against herbivory
 Secondary metabolite
 Volatile Organic Compound

References

Further reading

Plant anatomy
Leaves
Chemical ecology